"Crying in the Rain" is a song composed by Carole King with lyrics by Howard Greenfield, originally recorded by American duo the Everly Brothers. The single peaked at number six on the US Billboard Hot 100 in 1962.

The song was the only collaboration between songwriters Greenfield and King, both of whom worked for Aldon Music at the time of the song's composition. On a whim, two Aldon songwriting partnerships decided to switch partners for a day – Gerry Goffin (who normally worked with King) partnered with Greenfield's frequent writing partner, Jack Keller, leaving King and Greenfield to pair up for the day. Despite the commercial success of their collaboration, King and Greenfield never wrote another song together.

Track listing

Charts

Tammy Wynette version

In 1981, "Crying in the Rain" was notably covered by American country artist Tammy Wynette. It became a major hit after being released as a single that year.

Wynette's version was produced by Chips Moman at the Moman Recording Studio in Las Vegas, Nevada. The recording session also included nine additional tracks that would appear on Wynette's 1981 studio album.

The song was released as a single in July 1981. It reached number 18 on the Billboard Hot Country Singles chart that same year. "Crying in the Rain" became Wynette's third single to reach the country songs top 20 in the 1980s decade. The song was issued on Wynette's twenty-second studio album, You Brought Me Back (1981). Additionally, "Crying in the Rain" peaked at number 11 on the RPM Country Tracks chart in Canada around the same time. It was her highest-charting solo song on the RPM survey since 1979.

Track listing
7-inch single
A. "Crying in the Rain" – 3:12
B. "Bring My Baby Back to Me" – 3:25

Charts

A-ha version

In 1989, Norwegian band A-ha covered the song. It was the first single taken from their fourth studio album, East of the Sun, West of the Moon (1990). Following its success, A-ha became closer to the Everly Brothers, who had originally recorded the song. The band members were presented a set of guitars by the Everly Brothers that A-ha continues to use.

Commercial performance
"Crying in the Rain" was A-ha's last single to reach the top 40 on a Billboard chart in the United States to date, peaking at number 26 on the Hot Adult Contemporary Tracks chart during the week ending April 6, 1991. It was more popular in other countries, topping the charts in the band's native Norway, and peaking at number 13 in the UK Singles Chart. It was the 32nd most successful song of the year 2010 in Romanian Top 100, although it peaked outside the Top 20.

Music video
The video was directed by Steve Barron. The theme of the video is a robbery gone wrong. It is actually the second version of this video. The first version did not feature any of the scenes of Morten Harket singing alone. The video was filmed entirely with a specific technique of mobile cameras, and it was filmed in Big Timber, Montana. Academy Award nominated actor John Hawkes (actor) had a small role as a robber in the music video for  Crying in the Rain by A-ha in 1990.

Track listings
UK CD single
 "Crying in the Rain" (LP version) – 4:25
 "(Seemingly) Nonstop July" – 2:55
 "Cry Wolf" (LP version) – 4:05

UK 7-inch single
A. "Crying in the Rain" (LP version) – 4:25
B. "(Seemingly) Nonstop July" – 2:55

UK 12-inch single
A. "Crying in the Rain" (LP version) – 4:25
B1. "(Seemingly) Nonstop July" – 2:55
B2. "Cry Wolf" (LP version) – 4:05

Charts

Weekly charts

Year-end charts

Other cover versions

"Crying in the Rain" was covered by many other artists. In 1969, The Sweet Inspirations recorded a rendition which reached number 38 on the US R&B chart. It was their second Everly Brothers cover hit, having charted two years earlier with "Let It Be Me."

In 1972, Penny DeHaven in duet with Del Reeves released a Country version on a single only (number 54 on the Billboard country chart). In 1989 it was covered by Blessings in Disguise, a band composed of Dave Hill and Noddy Holder of British hard rock band, Slade. The song was released as a single, backed with the Dave Hill written track, "Wild Nites".

In 1976, American-Canadian trio Cotton, Lloyd and Christian released the song on a single (with "One More River" on the B-side). "Crying in the Rain" was also included on the trio's second studio album, Number Two.

The song was also covered by Crystal Gayle on her 1981 album Hollywood, Tennessee and by the British duo Peter and Gordon. Singer Art Garfunkel, of Simon and Garfunkel fame, covered the song in his album Up 'til Now (1993) in a duet with James Taylor. It was released in 2010 on Micky Dolenz King For a Day album.

The song was also covered by the Eurovision Song Contest winner Johnny Logan. German band Gregorian covered the song on their album Masters of Chant Chapter VI.

The song was covered by Marty Kristian of the New Seekers in 1973 "Crying In The Rain"/"A Woman Grows" (Polydor 2058 394)

Nick Lowe and Dave Edmunds released a version of the song on their 1980 EP, Nick Lowe & Dave Edmunds Sing The Everly Brothers.

Carole King covered the song she co-wrote on her 1983 album Speeding Time and in a rare live performance with the group The Wallflowers in a televised performance.

In 1994, Art Garfunkel had a Canadian Pop and AC hit with the song.

Danzig covered the song on the 2015 album Skeletons.

References

External links
 [ allmusic review of The Everly Brothers version]

1961 songs
1962 singles
1981 singles
1990 singles
A-ha songs
Crystal Gayle songs
Dave Edmunds songs
Epic Records singles
The Everly Brothers songs
Jan and Dean songs
Music videos directed by Steve Barron
Nick Lowe songs
Number-one singles in Norway
Song recordings produced by Christopher Neil
Songs about weather
Songs with lyrics by Howard Greenfield
Songs written by Carole King
Sweet Inspirations songs
Tammy Wynette songs
Warner Records singles